The Gerald R. Ford class is a class of nuclear powered aircraft carriers currently being constructed for the United States Navy. The class, with a planned total of ten ships, will replace the Navy's current carriers on a one-for-one basis, starting with the lead ship, replacing , and then eventually taking the place of the existing  carriers. The new vessels have a hull similar to the Nimitz-class, but introduce technologies since developed with the CVN(X)/CVN-21 program, such as the Electromagnetic Aircraft Launch System (EMALS), as well as other design features intended to improve efficiency and reduce operating costs, including sailing with smaller crews. This class of aircraft carriers is named after former US President Gerald R. Ford. The first ship of the class, CVN-78, was procured in 2008 and commissioned into service on 22 July 2017. The second ship of the class, is expected to be commissioned into service in 2024.

Design features
Carriers of the Gerald R. Ford class have:
 Advanced Arresting Gear.
 Automation, allowing a crew of several hundred fewer than the Nimitz-class carrier.
 The updated RIM-162 Evolved SeaSparrow Missile.
 An AN/SPY-3 X Band multifunction radar and an AN/SPY-4 S Band volume search radar. Designated together as Dual Band Radar (DBR), initially developed for the s. Starting with John F. Kennedy (CVN-79), the AN/SPY-6 will replace the AN/SPY-4 as the volume search component of the system.
 An Electromagnetic Aircraft Launch System (EMALS) in place of traditional steam catapults for launching aircraft.
 A new nuclear reactor design (the A1B reactor) for greater power generation.
 Stealth features to reduce radar cross-section.
 The ability to carry up to 90 aircraft, including the Boeing F/A-18E/F Super Hornet, Boeing EA-18G Growler, Grumman C-2 Greyhound, Northrop Grumman E-2 Hawkeye, Lockheed Martin F-35C Lightning II, Sikorsky SH-60 Seahawk helicopters, and unmanned combat aerial vehicles.

The biggest visible difference from earlier supercarriers is the more aft location of the island (superstructure). The Gerald R. Ford-class carriers will have a reduced whole-life cost due in part to reduced crew size. These ships are intended to sustain 160 sorties per day for 30-plus days, with a surge capability of 270 sorties per day. Director of Operational Testing Michael Gilmore has criticized the assumptions used in these forecasts as unrealistic and has indicated sortie rates similar to the 120/240 per day of the Nimitz class would be acceptable.

Development

The current  in US naval service have been part of United States power projection strategy since Nimitz was commissioned in 1975.

The Nimitz design has accommodated many new technologies over the decades, but it has limited ability to support the most recent technical advances. As a 2005 Rand report said, "The biggest problems facing the Nimitz class are the limited electrical power generation capability and the upgrade-driven increase in ship weight and erosion of the center-of-gravity margin needed to maintain ship stability."

With these constraints in mind, the US Navy developed what was initially known as the CVN-21 program, which evolved into CVN-78, Gerald R. Ford. Improvements were made through developing technologies and more efficient design. Major design changes include a larger flight deck, improvements in weapons and material handling, a new propulsion plant design that requires fewer people to operate and maintain, and a new, smaller island that has been pushed aft. Technological advances in electromagnetics have led to the development of an Electromagnetic Aircraft Launch System (EMALS) and an Advanced Arresting Gear (AAG). An integrated warfare system, the Ship Self-Defense System (SSDS), has been developed to allow the ship to more easily take on new missions. The new Dual Band Radar (DBR) combines S-band and X-band radar.

These advances will allow the new Gerald R. Ford-class carriers to launch 25% more sorties, generate triple the electrical power with improved efficiency, and offer crew quality-of-life improvements.

Flight deck

Catapult No. 4 on the Nimitz class cannot launch fully loaded aircraft because of low wing clearance along the edge of the flight deck.

The movement of weapons from storage and assembly to the aircraft on the flight deck has also been streamlined and accelerated. Ordnance will be lifted to the centralized rearming location via higher-capacity weapons elevators that use linear motors. These elevators are located so that ordnance need not cross any areas of aircraft movement, thereby reducing traffic problems in the hangars and on the flight deck. In 2008, Rear Admiral Dennis M. Dwyer said these changes will make it hypothetically possible to rearm the airplanes in "minutes instead of hours".

Power generation
The new Bechtel A1B reactor for the Gerald R. Ford class is smaller and simpler, requires fewer crew, and yet is far more powerful than the Nimitz-class A4W reactor. Two reactors will be installed on each Gerald R. Ford-class carrier, providing a power generation capacity at least 25% greater than the 550 MW (thermal) of the two A4W reactors in a Nimitz-class carrier. The portion of thermal power allotted to electrical generation will be tripled.

The propulsion and power plant of the Nimitz-class carriers were designed in the 1960s, when onboard technologies required less electrical power. "New technologies added to the Nimitz-class ships have generated increased demands for electricity; the current base load leaves little margin to meet expanding demands for power."

The Gerald R. Ford-class ships convert steam into power by piping it to four main turbine generators (MTG) to generate electricity for major ship systems, and the new electromagnetic catapults. The Gerald R. Ford-class ships use steam turbines for propulsion.

A larger power output is a major component of the integrated warfare system. Engineers took extra steps to ensure that integrating unforeseen technological advances onto a Gerald R. Ford-class aircraft carrier would be possible. The Navy expects the Gerald R. Ford class will be part of the fleet for 90 years, until the year 2105, which means that the class must successfully accept new technology over the decades. Only half of the electric power generation capacity is used by currently planned systems, with half remaining available for future technologies.

Electromagnetic Aircraft Launch System

The Electromagnetic Aircraft Launch System (EMALS) launches aircraft by means of a catapult employing a linear induction motor rather than the steam piston used on the Nimitz class. The EMALS accelerates aircraft more smoothly, putting less stress on their airframes. The EMALS also weighs less, is expected to cost less and require less maintenance, and can launch both heavier and lighter aircraft than a steam piston-driven system. It also reduces the carrier's requirement for fresh water, thus reducing the demand for energy-intensive desalination.

Advanced Arresting Gear landing system

Electromagnets are also being used in the new Advanced Arresting Gear (AAG) system. The current system relies on hydraulics to slow and stop a landing aircraft. While the hydraulic system is effective, as demonstrated by more than fifty years of implementation, the AAG system offers a number of improvements. The current system is unable to capture unmanned aerial vehicles (UAVs) without damaging them due to extreme stresses on the airframe. UAVs do not have the necessary mass to drive the large hydraulic piston used to trap heavier, manned airplanes. By using electromagnetics the energy absorption is controlled by a turbo-electric engine. This makes the trap smoother and reduces shock on airframes. Even though the system will look the same from the flight deck as its predecessor, it will be more flexible, safe, and reliable, and will require less maintenance and manning.

Sensors and self-defense systems
Another addition to the Gerald R. Ford class is an integrated active electronically scanned array search and tracking radar system. The dual-band radar (DBR) was being developed for both the Zumwalt-class guided missile destroyers and the Gerald R. Ford-class aircraft carriers by Raytheon. The island can be kept smaller by replacing six to ten radar antennas with a single six-faced radar. The DBR works by combining the X band AN/SPY-3 multifunction radar with the S band Volume Search Radar (VSR) emitters, distributed into three phased arrays. The S-band radar was later deleted from the Zumwalt destroyers to save money.

The three faces dedicated to the X-band radar handle low-altitude tracking and radar illumination, while the three S-band faces handle target search and tracking regardless of weather. "Operating simultaneously over two electromagnetic frequency ranges, the DBR marks the first time this functionality has been achieved using two frequencies coordinated by a single resource manager."

This new system has no moving parts, therefore minimizing maintenance and manning requirements for operation.
The AN/SPY-3 consists of three active arrays and the Receiver/Exciter (REX) cabinets abovedecks and the Signal and Data Processor (SDP) subsystem below-decks. The VSR has a similar architecture, with the beamforming and narrowband down-conversion functionality occurring in two additional cabinets per array. A central controller (the resource manager) resides in the Data Processor (DP). The DBR is the first radar system that uses a central controller and two active-array radars operating at different frequencies. The DBR gets its power from the Common Array Power System (CAPS), which comprises Power Conversion Units (PCUs) and Power Distribution Units (PDUs). The DBR is cooled via a closed-loop cooling system called the Common Array Cooling System (CACS).

The Enterprise Air Surveillance Radar (EASR) is a new design surveillance radar that is to be installed in the second Gerald R. Ford-class aircraft carrier, in lieu of the Dual Band radar. The s starting with LHA-8 and the planned LX(R) will also have this radar. The EASR suite's initial per-unit cost will be about $180 million less than the DBR, for which the estimate is about $500 million.

Possible upgrades
Future defense systems, such as free-electron laser directed-energy weapons, electric armor, and tracking systems will require more power. "Only half of the electrical power-generation capability on CVN-78 is needed to run currently planned systems, including EMALS. CVN-78 will thus have the power reserves that the Nimitz class lacks to run lasers and electric armor." The addition of new technologies, power systems, design layout, and better control systems results in an increased sortie rate of 25% over the Nimitz class and a 25% reduction in manpower required to operate.

Waste management technology will be deployed on Gerald R. Ford. Co-developed with the Carderock Division of the Naval Surface Warfare Center, PyroGenesis Canada Inc., was in 2008 awarded the contract to outfit the ship with a Plasma Arc Waste Destruction System (PAWDS). This compact system will treat all combustible solid waste generated on board the ship. After having completed factory acceptance testing in Montreal, the system was scheduled to be shipped to the Huntington Ingalls shipyard in late 2011 for installation on the carrier.

The Navy is developing a free-electron laser (FEL) to defend against cruise missiles and small-boat swarms.

3D computer-aided design
Newport News Shipbuilding used a full-scale three-dimensional product model developed in Dassault Systèmes CATIA V5 to design and plan the construction of the Gerald R. Ford class of aircraft carriers.

The CVN 78 class was designed to have better weapons movement paths, largely eliminating horizontal movements within the ship. Current plans call for advanced weapons elevators to move from storage areas to dedicated weapons handling areas. Sailors would use motorized carts to move the weapons from storage to the elevators at different levels of the weapons magazines. Linear motors are being considered for the advanced weapons elevators. The elevators will also be relocated such that they will not impede aircraft operations on the flight deck. The redesign of the weapons movement paths and the location of the weapons elevators on the flight deck will reduce manpower and contribute to a much higher sortie generation rate.

Planned aircraft complement
The Gerald R. Ford class is designed to accommodate the new Joint Strike Fighter carrier variant aircraft (F-35C), but aircraft development and testing delays have affected integration activities on CVN-78. These integration activities include testing the F-35C with CVN-78's EMALS and advanced arresting gear system and testing the ship's storage capabilities for the F-35C's lithium-ion batteries, tires, and wheels. As a result of F-35C developmental delays, the US Navy will not field the aircraft until at least 2018—one year after CVN-78 delivery. As a result, the Navy has deferred critical F-35C integration activities, which introduces a risk of system incompatibilities and costly retrofits to the ship after it is delivered to the Navy.

Crew accommodations

Systems that reduce crew workload have allowed the ship's company on Gerald R. Ford-class carriers to total only 2,600 sailors, about 700 fewer than a Nimitz-class carrier. The massive, 180-man berthing areas on the Nimitz class are replaced by 40-rack berthing areas on Gerald R. Ford-class carriers. The smaller berthings are quieter and the layout requires less foot traffic through other spaces. Typically the racks are stacked three high, with locker space per person. The berthings do not feature modern "sit-up" racks with more headroom; bottom and middle racks only accommodate a sailor lying down. Each berthing has an associated head, including showers, vacuum-powered septic-system toilets (no urinals since the berthings are built gender-neutral) and sinks to reduce travel and traffic to access those facilities. Wifi-enabled lounges are located across the passageway in separate spaces from the berthing's racks.

Since deployment, the first two carriers of the class have run into problems with the plumbing of the waste system. The pipes were too narrow to handle the load of users, resulting in the vacuum failing and repeatedly clogged toilets. To alleviate the problem, specialized acidic cleaning solutions have been used to flush out the sewage system. These cleaning treatments cost about $400,000 each time, resulting in a substantial unplanned increase in the lifetime expense of operating these ships according to the GAO. These cleanings will have to be performed for the lifetime of the ship.

Medical facilities
Gerald R. Ford, first in the class, has an on-board hospital that includes a full laboratory, pharmacy, operating room, 3-bed intensive care unit, 2-bed emergency room, and 41-bed hospital ward, staffed by 11 medical officers and 30 hospital corpsmen.

Construction

Construction of the first vessel in the class, CVN-78 Gerald R. Ford, officially began on 11 August 2005, when Northrop Grumman held a ceremonial steel cut for a 15-ton plate that would form part of a side shell unit of the carrier, but construction began in earnest in early 2007. The carrier was assembled at Newport News Shipbuilding, a division of Huntington Ingalls Industries (formerly Northrop Grumman Shipbuilding) in Newport News, Virginia. This is the only shipyard in the United States that can build nuclear-powered aircraft carriers.

In 2005, Gerald R. Ford was estimated to cost at least $13 billion: $5 billion for research and development plus $8 billion to build. A 2009 report raised the estimate to $14 billion, including $9 billion for construction. In 2013, the life-cycle cost per operating day of a carrier strike group (including aircraft) was estimated at $6.5 million by the Center for New American Security.

The last Nimitz-class aircraft carrier is to be decommissioned in 2058.

In a speech on 6 April 2009, Secretary of Defense Robert Gates announced that each Gerald R. Ford-class carrier would be built over five years, yielding a "more fiscally sustainable path" and a 10-carrier fleet after 2040. That changed in December 2016, when Navy Secretary Ray Mabus signed a Force Structure Assessment calling for a 355-ship fleet with 12 aircraft carriers. If enacted, this policy would require each Gerald R. Ford-class carrier to be built in three to four years.

First-of-class type design changes
As construction of CVN-78 progressed, the shipbuilder discovered first-of-class type design changes, which it will use to update the model before the construction of the remaining vessels of its class. Several of these design changes related to EMALS configuration changes, which required electrical, wiring, and other changes within the ship. The Navy anticipates additional design changes stemming from remaining advanced arresting gear development and testing. According to the Navy, many of these 19,000 changes were programmed into the construction schedule early on—a result of the government's decision, at contract award, to introduce improvements to the ship's warfare systems during construction, which are heavily dependent on evolving commercial technologies.

Naming
There was a movement by the  Carrier Veterans' Association to have CVN-78 named after America rather than after President Ford. Eventually, the amphibious assault ship LHA-6 was named .

On 27 May 2011, the U.S. Department of Defense announced the name of CVN-79 would be .

On 1 December 2012, Secretary of the Navy Ray Mabus announced that CVN-80 would be named USS Enterprise. The information was delivered during a prerecorded speech as part of the deactivation ceremony for the previous . The future  will be the ninth U.S. Navy ship to bear this name.

On 20 January 2020, during a ceremony in Pearl Harbor, Hawaii, on Martin Luther King Jr. Day, Acting Secretary of the Navy Thomas B. Modly named a future Gerald R. Ford-class aircraft carrier in honor of World War II hero Doris Miller. This will be the first aircraft carrier named for an African American, and the first aircraft carrier to be named for a sailor in the enlisted ranks. It is the second ship named in honor of Miller, who was the first African American to be awarded the Navy Cross.

Ships in class
There are expected to be ten ships of this class. To date, five have been announced:

See also

 Modern United States Navy carrier air operations
 List of aircraft carriers
 List of naval ship classes in service
 List of current United States Navy ships
 List of aircraft carrier classes of the United States Navy
 A1B reactor
 Naval aviation
 Type 003 aircraft carrier (China)

Notes

References

External links

 Aircraft Carriers – CVN – US Navy Fact File
 Building The Ford Class Aircraft Carriers - Newport News Shipbuilding
 Design & Preparations Continue for the USA's New CVN-21 Super-Carrier (updated), Defense Industry Daily. Provides an extensive briefing re: the new ship class, and adds entries for many of the contracts under this program.
 Gerald R. Ford Class (CVN-78) Aircraft Carrier on Navy Recognition site
 GAO Reports: Poor Outcomes Are the Predictable Consequences of the Prevalent Acquisition Culture (October 2015), Follow-On Ships Need More Frequent and Accurate Cost Estimates to Avoid Pitfalls of Lead Ship (June 2017)

Aircraft carrier classes